Liang Xiaosheng (born 22 September 1949) is a Chinese novelist and screenwriter. Liang is a member of China Writers Association. He is also a professor at Beijing Language and Culture University. His novels have been translated into English, French, Japanese, Russian, and Italian.

Biography

Liang was born in Harbin, Heilongjiang in 1949, with his ancestral hometown in Rongcheng, Shandong.

In 1966, when the Cultural Revolution was launched by Mao Zedong, Liang graduated from Harbin 29th High School. Two years later, Liang went to the Great Northern Wilderness and worked in Shenyang Military Region.

In 1974, Liang was accepted to Fudan University and graduated in 1977. After graduation, he was assigned to Beijing Film Studio as an editor. In 1988, Liang was transferred to China Children's Film Studio.

Liang started to publish novels in 1979. His most well-known works are The Floating City, A Red Guard's Confessions, From Fudan University to Beijing Film Academy, The City of Snow, and The Depressed Chinese.

Works

Novellas
 The World's Life
 There Is A Storm Tonight

Novels
 Pretty Women
 The Floating City
 A Red Guard's Confessions
 From Fudan University to Beijing Film Academy
 The City of Snow
 The Depressed Chinese

Short stories
 If Heaven Has Feelings
 Death
 This Is A Mystical Land

Awards
 This Is A Mystical Land – National Short Story Award (1983)
 Father – National Short Story Award (1984)
 There Is A Storm Tonight – National Novella Award (1984)

References

1949 births
Living people
Writers from Harbin
Screenwriters from Heilongjiang
Chinese male novelists
Chinese male short story writers
Educators from Heilongjiang
People's Republic of China short story writers
Short story writers from Heilongjiang
Mao Dun Literature Prize laureates